Frank Harvey (22 December 1885 – 10 October 1965) was a British-born actor, producer and writer best known for his work in Australia.

Biography
Frank Harvey was born Harvey Ainsworth Hilton, in 1883 in Earls Court, London, son of John Ainsworth Hilton and Elizabeth Hilton. His occupation in the British 1911 Census was "actor" and was married with Grace Hilton, . He had 3 sisters, named Maria, Cora and Caroline according to the British 1891 Census.

Caroline Gladys Hilton was married to Hanns Wyldeck and from that union was born in 1914 Harvey Martin Wyldeck, also an actor, who died in England in 1989. He was the cousin to Frank Harvey, Harvey Ainsworth Hilton's son from Grace Hilton. Martin Wyldeck's son Christopher Wyldeck also moved to Australia in the 1970s and became a TV director. 

Harvey's father was also a writer, under the pen name Frank Harvey .

Early career
Harvey studied acting under Sir Herbert Beerbohm Tree and played Shakespearean parts in the Lyceum Theatre in London. In 1914 he was engaged by J. C. Williamson to play in Australia with Nancye Stewart, and did not return to Britain until 1926.

In 1922 and 1923 he played the leading man in a number of J & N Tait productions with the Emélie Polini troupe and toured Australia and New Zealand.

When Harvey returned to Britain, it took him several months to re-establish himself there, but was cast in The Transit of Venus and then had little difficulty finding work, being particularly well regarded for a role in Jew Suss. Acting in this saw him have a nervous breakdown and he was ordered to take three months off.

Harvey also had two plays produced, The Last Enemy and Cape Forlorn.

Return to Australia
By 1931 he was back in Melbourne to appear in a series of plays for J. C. Williamson, including On the Spot and a production of his own Cape Forlorn. Harvey said he preferred working on stage to screen:
An actor on the screen is not an actor at all, but a robot. In the days of the silent films, an actor could have a distinct screen personality; but now that speech has come, all that is ended. After the novelty has worn off, talking films will settle down here, as they have abroad, into a mere substitute for the silent films, and will not interfere in any way with the prosperity of the legitimate theatre. The screen should stick to the sphere in which it is really capable – the sphere of spectacular production, such as Iies outside the ambit of the legitimate stage. It is really a glorified sideshow.
Harvey returned to London in October 1931, but was back in Australia in 1933 to work for F. W. Thring at Efftee Productions as an actor and screenwriter.

In 1935 he moved to Sydney and began writing and acting for ABC radio. This involvement later led to full-time appointment as senior drama producer in 1944, directing such stars as Queenie Ashton (in early episodes of Blue Hills), Lyndall Barbour and Nigel Lovell. He appeared as Nestor the story-teller in the Argonauts Club for most of the '40s. His play False Colours was staged by Doris Fitton's Independent Theatre.

In 1936 he founded a school of voice production and dramatic art with Claude Flemming.

Cinesound
That year Harvey also went to work for Ken G. Hall at Cinesound Productions as a studio dialogue director and in-house screenwriter. Starting with It Isn't Done (1937), Harvey wrote or co-wrote nine produced feature film scripts for Cinesound over the next four years, often playing small roles in them as well.

According to one observer, Harvey's work as an actor and writer showed his bias towards the theatrical: "his scripts tend towards fulsome dialogues with witty repartee and epigram-matical statements, and his acting, particularly in Tall Timbers (1937), tends to exploit dramatic gestures and facial expressions far more intensively than was then required for screen 'naturalism'. Under Hall's direction, Harvey's dialogues were simplified and images allowed to express more of the script's content; his acting too became increasingly restrained as he adjusted to the demands of the film medium."

Radio
During World War II, Harvey served in the Volunteer Defence Corps until 1944, when he left the army and went under contract to ABC as a radio actor and producer. He eventually became ABC's head of radio drama.

By the time Harvey retired in 1952 he had directed many hundreds of radio plays. He was appreciated by actors for his wit and communication skills.

Personal
He married Grace Ackerman in 1910 and divorced her in 1923 on grounds of desertion.
On 3 April 1924 he married Helen Rosamond "Bobbie" McMillan, an actress with the Emélie Polini troupe and daughter of Sir William McMillan, Minister for Railways in New South Wales, Australia.

A son (1912–1981) by his first marriage, also called Frank Harvey, was a British playwright and novelist who wrote the play Saloon Bar and screenplays for British movies including Seven Days to Noon (1950) and I'm Alright Jack (1960).

He had a daughter, Helen, by his second wife.

Plays

As writer
 The Last Enemy (1929) (later played by a young Laurence Olivier)
 Cape Forlorn (1930)
Ann Chisolm (1933)
 False Colours (1935)
 Murder Tomorrow (1937)

As actor
 Joseph and His Brethren (1914) w/ Nancye Stewart (her debut)
 The Man Who Stayed at Home (1915 in Australia and New Zealand)
 Within the Law (1915)w/ Muriel Starr
 The Marriage of Kitty (1916) w/ Marie Tempest
 Annabelle (1916) w/ Marie Tempest
 A Pair of Silk Stockings (1917) w/ Marie Tempest and Nancye Stewart
 The Easiest Way (1918) w/ Muriel Starr
 The Silent Witness (1919) w/ Muriel Starr
 Adam and Eva (1921) w/ Maud Hannaford
 Scandal (1922 in New Zealand) w/ Emélie Polini
 My Lady's Dress (1923 in New Zealand) w/ Emélie Polini
 The Flaw (1923 in New Zealand) w/ Emélie Polini
 De Luxe Annie (1923 in New Zealand) w/ Emélie Polini
 The Bird of Paradise (1923) w/ Muriel Starr
 The Garden of Allah (1924) w/ Muriel Starr
 A Royal Divorce (1925) w/ Muriel Starr
 So This Is London (1925) w/ Muriel Starr and Mayne Lynton
 Secrets (1925)
 Within the Law (1925)
 Monsieur Beaucaire (1925) w/ Mary Hinton
 Seventh Heaven (1925) w/ Remy Carpen
 The Silver King (1926) w/ Remy Carpen and Mayne Lynton
 East Lynne (1929) in New Zealand w/ Muriel StarrThe Transit of Venus – in LondonJew Suss as the DukeCape Forlorn (1930) in London
 The Calendar (1931) w/ Campbell Copelin and Coral Brown (her debut)
 On the Spot (1931) in Melbourne w/ Campbell Copelin
 Cape Forlorn – start 29 August 1930 – Criterion Theatre, Sydney – w/ Harvey Adams and Charles Wheeler
 My Lady's Dress (1931) playing seven different roles w/ Iris DarbyshireThe Man with a Load of Mischief (November 1931) – Haymarket, London 
 Rope (1932) w/ Campbell Copelin
 Mother of Pearl (1934) starring Alice Delysia and Campbell Copelin, (also written and directed by him)
 Her Past (1934) starring Alice Delysia and Campbell Copelin (also directed)
 Black Limelight (1939) w/ Henry Mollison and Lina Basquette at newly opened Minerva Theatre

Filmography
 Within Our Gates (1915) – director
 Cape Forlorn (1931) – original play, actor
 The Mayor's Nest (1932) actor
 The Love Contract (1932) actor
 Up for the Derby (1933) actor
 The Streets of London (1934) – actor
 A Ticket in Tatts (1934) – actor
 Sheepmates (1934) (abandoned) – actor
 Clara Gibbings (1934) – writer
 Heritage (1935) – actor
 White Death (1936)
 It Isn't Done (1937) cowriter Carl Dudley, actor
 Tall Timbers (1937) – writer, actor
 Lovers and Luggers aka Vengeance of the Deep (1937) – writer, actor
 The Broken Melody aka The Vagabond Violinist (1938) – writer, actor
 Dad and Dave Come to Town (1938) – writer, actor
 Let George Do It (1938) – writer, actor
 Murder Tomorrow (1938) - original play
 Mr. Chedworth Steps Out (1939) – writer
 Gone to the Dogs (1939) – writer, actor
 Dad Rudd, MP (1940) – writer, actor

Unproduced projects
musical version of Robbery Under Arms (1934)
film version of Collits' Inn (circa 1934)

Radio credits
As actor
 Monsieur Beaucaire (1935)
 Scandal(1935)
 My Lady's Dress (1935)
 Dead or Alive by Edmund Barclay (1936)
 The Fire on the Snow (1941 original production by Frank Clewlow) as Robert Falcon Scott
As director
 Macbeth (1948) with Lloyd Berrell and Lyndall Barbour
 Waterloo Bridge (1948) with Max Osbiston

SourcesThe Golden Age of Australian Drama'' Richard Lane, Melbourne University Press 1994 
Biography by Stephen Vagg

Frank Harvey Australian theatre credits at AusStage
Frank Harvey at the National Film and Sound Archive

Notes and references

1885 births
1965 deaths
Australian male stage actors
Australian male film actors
Australian screenwriters
Australian male radio actors
Australian radio producers
20th-century Australian male actors
Australian film studio executives
20th-century Australian screenwriters
Volunteer Defence Corps soldiers
British emigrants to Australia